Julia Piaton (born 29 January 1985) is a French actress. She is mainly known for playing the role of Odile in Serial (Bad) Weddings and Aure Hazan in Family Business.

Theater

Filmography

References

External links
 

1985 births
Living people
21st-century French actresses
French film actresses
French television actresses